Denise Patricia Harlow is an American politician from Maine. Harlow, an independent from Portland, Maine, served in the Maine House of Representatives from December 2010 until December 2018. She succeeded her father, Charles Harlow, for the District 116 seat in 2010.

On May 26, 2017, Harlow unenrolled from the Democratic Party, along with fellow representative Ralph Chapman.

References

Year of birth missing (living people)
Living people
Politicians from Portland, Maine
Maine Democrats
Maine Independents
Members of the Maine House of Representatives
Women state legislators in Maine
Brandeis University alumni
Place of birth missing (living people)
21st-century American politicians
21st-century American women politicians